TVAC (The Vehicle Application Centre) was a British company based in Leyland, Lancashire that performed chassis conversions and assembled bodies for commercial vehicles, refuse trucks and fire engines.

History
In 1996 TVAC approached Plastisol, based in the Netherlands. At this time Plastisol produced bodies for airport crash fire engines. TVAC wanted Plastisol to produce bodies for smaller fire engines, and TVAC would assemble similar bodies under licence for the United Kingdom market.

The first fire engine bodied by TVAC was a DAF 55 appliance for the Lancashire Fire and Rescue Service, the brigade that covered the area where TVAC's factory was located. This body had a number of technological innovations: the bodies were made with injected resin, and were an integral unit containing the main body and water tank, making the appliance lighter, and also leaving more room for storing equipment. 

Subsequent orders from, by 2006, 27 fire authorities across the United Kingdom included a major contract with the London Fire Brigade to supply frontline fire appliances, building four Unimogs with interchangeable bodies for firefighting or rescue and recovery for the Surrey Fire and Rescue Service, supplying a removeable welfare pod transported by a converted Renault Master for the Derbyshire Fire and Rescue Service, and supplying a series of Iveco Daily-based midi fire engines to the Cheshire Fire and Rescue Service.

TVAC were also responsible for modifying the chassis of light and heavy goods vehicles, as well as assembling refuse trucks. The company also assembled a bulletproof Vaxuhall Movano-based mobile bank for the Bank of Scotland for use on the remote Shetland Islands.

In 2007, TVAC and ambulance builder UV Modular were both acquired by asset and wealth management firm AssetCo, intending to consolidate AssetCo's position as the UK's largest supplier of fire appliances and ambulances. However, TVAC would enter administration in December 2008 and were wound up early the next year; their intellectual property rights and some staff were subsequently acquired by former parent Plastisol. The directors of AssetCo at the time of TVAC's purchase were subsequently charged with 27 allegations of financial misconduct by the Financial Reporting Council in 2018.

TVAC had collapsed having been unable to complete a contract for four combined aerial response pump (CARP) appliances on Mercedes-Benz Econic chassis for the South Yorkshire Fire and Rescue Service to specification. A second CARP for Humberside Fire and Rescue Service was cancelled when it was discovered that Humberside's CARP was too heavy for legal use on UK roads when fully loaded with firefighting equipment. Throughout their service, these remained in need of further modifications for mechanical and weight defects, while members of the Fire Brigades Union in South Yorkshire would later refuse to operate their CARP appliances due to safety concerns.

External links
Archived TVAC website

References

Emergency services equipment makers
2009 disestablishments in England